Third warrant officer (3WO) is a warrant officer rank in the Singapore Armed Forces. It is the most junior of the warrant officers, and holders of this rank are given appointments such as company sergeant major. The rank was newly introduced on 14 May 2009, and went into effect on 1 April 2010, as part of a revised career structure for warrant officers. The rank insignia is similar to the one for second warrant officer, although the former has a finer chevron.

Master sergeants are promoted to third warrant officer after attending the 3WO Professional Leadership Course.

See also
 Singapore Armed Forces ranks
 Specialist (Singapore)

References

Military ranks of Singapore
Warrant officers